The Action at Bir el Gubi  (November 1941) took place on 19 November 1941 near Biʾr al-Ġubbiyy, Libya. It was one of the opening engagements of Operation Crusader in North Africa  and resulted in a success for the Italian armoured forces.

Background 
On 15 November 1941 General Claude Auchinleck, commander of the Eighth Army, launched Operation Crusader, aimed at forcing the Axis army in Libya to lift the siege of Tobruk and if possible, to force the Axis to retreat from Cyrenaica. The Eighth Army was composed of the XIII Corps, formed of infantry divisions, and XXX Corps, which included the 7th Armoured Division, formerly belonging to the Western Desert Force and one of the authors of the destruction of the Tenth Army during Operation Compass. The British plan was to circumvent the Italo-German positions on their southern side with the 7th Armoured Division, and then to attack the Axis forces besieging Tobruk.

Erwin Rommel was planning a new attack on Tobruk and had therefore gathered his forces on the north-west, between Tobruk and the Egyptian border, near the coast. The Ariete Division was given the task of facing the XIII Corps (on the eastern flank) and defending the road junction at Bir el Gubi, from where supplies headed for Bir Hakeim, Giarabub, Sidi Omar, Tobruk and El Adem were sent.

Prelude

Forces involved 
The Italian 132nd Armored Division "Ariete", under the command of general Mario Balotta, included the 132nd Tank Regiment with three battalions (VII, VIII, IX Battalions) equipped with M13/40 medium tanks, the 32nd Tank Regiment with three more battalions (I, II, III) equipped with Fiat L3 tankettes, the 8th Bersaglieri Regiment with two motorized Bersaglieri battalions (V and XII) and one Infantry support gun battalion (III), the 132nd Artillery Regiment with two 75/27 mm gun Groups, one Blackshirt Artillery Militia (Milmart) Battery with three 102/35 gun trucks and one section of the 6th Milmart Battery with two 102/35 gun trucks. As the 32nd Tank Regiment was deployed far away and would not take part in the battle with its L3 tankettes, the Italian forces involved in the battle would be about 130 M13/40 medium tanks.

The Commonwealth forces tasked with attacking Bir el Gubi consisted of the British 22nd Armoured Brigade under Brigadier John Scott-Cockburn, consisting of the 2nd Royal Gloucestershire Hussars and the 3rd and 4th County of London Yeomanry, one motorised infantry company of the 1st Battalion King's Royal Rifle Corps, one battery of the 4th Regiment Royal Horse Artillery with eight 25 pounder gun-howitzers, one anti-tank section with Ordnance QF 2-pounder anti-tank guns, one light anti-aircraft battery with Bofors 40 mm guns, and the 11th Hussars as a reconnaissance force. The Commonwealth forces involved in the attack had 150 Crusader tanks plus a number of armoured cars.

Action 
On 15 November the Ariete Division, facing the XXX Corps on the eastern flank, was re-deployed on the southern flank, as concentrations of British forces (the 7th Armoured Division) had been detected near Fort Maddalena. The defense was then re-organized in a line of strongholds held by Bersaglieri, directly supported by 47/32 mm guns and 81 mm mortars, and indirectly supported by the 75/27 mm batteries. Fortification work started at once, and was continued till noon on 18 November.

The 7th Armoured Division was divided in three armoured brigades, the 4th, 7th and 22nd Armoured Brigade (the latter having been detached from the 1st Armoured Division). The 4th moved directly north from its bases, in order to support the advance of XXX Corps, while the 7th headed for Sidi Rezegh (where the Axis air bases were) and the 22nd (on the left flank of the 7th) headed for Bir el Gubi, aiming at driving off the Ariete Division and then attack the 21st Panzer Division from the rear. The 22nd Armoured Brigade was preceded by the armoured cars of the 11th Hussars Regiment, employed as a scouting force.

18 November 
At 14:00 on 18 November the British armoured cars (Squadron B of the 11th Hussars) were spotted about 10 km south east of Bir el Gubi by a platoon of M13/40, which closed in on them and opened fire. The armoured cars, having a higher speed, easily disengaged and broke contact. The oncoming darkness prevented a section of Royal Horse Artillery from approaching to allow the armoured cars to carry on the reconnaissance. British aircraft bombed the bulk of the Ariete, wounding some men and destroying a tractor of the 132nd Artillery Regiment. Upon learning of the British appearance, Balotta ordered his division to assume a defensive formation. The front line held by the Bersaglieri was shortened, and the five Milmart gun trucks were deployed just north of Bir el Gubi; the 132nd Tank Regiment was deployed six kilometres north-west of Bir el Gubi, in order to repel potential counterattacks and to cover the road to El Adem. The 3rd, 5th and 12th Bersaglieri Battalions held the defensive line.

19 November 
In the morning of 19 November, the 22nd Armoured Brigade moved towards Bir el Gubi, again preceded by armoured cars of the 11th Hussars. The 3rd Company of the VII Tank Battalion (M13/40 tanks), supported by a section of 75/27 guns, counterattacked and forced the armoured cars to retreat. The Italian tanks were however uncovered on their right flank; 25-pdr fire from the Royal Horse Artillery prevented them from advancing, and they were thus circumvented and attacked from the rear by the Crusaders of Squadron H/2, Royal Gloucestershire Hussars. The Italians lost three M13/40s (and several men, including three officers) in the fight and then retreated to their lines, along with the artillery section. After this action, the armoured cars of the 11th Hussars returned to the front of the brigade, and, around 12:00, they sighted the Bersaglieri defensive line about 4,5 km south of Bir el Gubi.

At 10:30 the 22nd Armoured Brigade, supported by Royal Horse Artillery fire, advanced with 2nd Royal Gloucestershire Hussars on the right and 4th County of London Yeomanry on the left, while 3rd County of Londonr Yeomanry was kept in reserve. The first Italian unit to be engaged was the III Bersaglieri Infantry Support Gun Battalion; not having been fully deployed yet, the battalion was overrun by the tanks of Squadron H/2, Royal Gloucestershire Hussars. A platoon of M13/40 tanks of IX Battalion was sent to help the Bersaglieri, but was destroyed by the combined action of Squadrons G and H of 2nd Royal Gloucestershire Hussars, the Italian platoon commander being among the killed. Squadron F of 2nd Royal Gloucestershire Hussars instead faced the V Bersaglieri Battalion, which, being well-entrenched and supported by Milmart artillery, halted the British advance.

The British tanks then regrouped and Squadrons F and G of 2nd Royal Gloucestershire Hussars managed to break through the line held by the III Infantry Gun Battalion, thus opening their way north. 4th County of London Yeomanry headed towards the (not yet fortified) positions held by the XII Bersaglieri Battalion, but Squadron A, leading the attack, was stopped by Italian artillery fire, while Squadron B attempted to overtake the Italian right flank, in order to outflank the Bersaglieri battalion. Several British tanks managed to break through the strongholds, and they cut off the regimental command, which rejoined XII Battalion with difficulty.

The situation had become desperate for the Italian defenders. At 13:30, 132nd Tank Regiment begn a counter-attack; the 1st Company of the VII Tank Battalion, closely followed by the 2nd Company and by the entire VIII Battalion (overall 60 Italian tanks), was sent south to attack the 2nd Royal Gloucestershire Hussars. The Italian tanks heavily engaged the two British regiments, eventually outflanking them and forcing them to retreat. Squadron C of 4th County of London Yeomanry was sent to try to circumvent the Bersaglieri positions, but the attempt was stopped by the fire of the Italian anti-tank guns and by the Milmart gun trucks, which inflicted heavy losses on the British troops.

The 3rd County of London Yeomanry was moved to cover the right flank of 2nd Royal Gloucestershire Hussars, and it managed to take by surprise the Italian tank platoon that had outflanked the Royal Gloucestershire Hussars on the right side; the British tanks quickly defeated the Italian tanks, then they left Squadron B in defensive formation to keep contact with the other regiment, while the British regimental command advanced. At this point, however, the British force ran into the Bersaglieri anti-tank defenses, which soon knocked out four tanks, including the one of the regimental commander.

At 16:30, 2nd Royal Gloucestershire Hussars was forced to retreat, under pressure from Italian tanks, and constantly kept under the fire of anti-tank guns and gun trucks. 4th County of London Yeomanry also withdrew; 3rd County of London Yeomanry, which had been less worn out by the previous fight, was ordered at 16:50 to regroup to try a new attack, but the losses suffered induced a countermand at 17:50. The attack of 22nd Armoured Brigade had completely failed.

Aftermath 
The Action at Bir el Gubi had been an impressive victory for the Italians. They had not only stood up under the weight of a large British armored offensive but inflicted heavy damage to the attacker while retaining the ground they defended. With their forces unexpectedly tied up with the Italians, only one full-strength Armored unit reached Sidi Rezegh. Rommel's Afrika Korps subsequently crushed it. The battle might have turned out differently had the British hit the Afrika Korps with the intended strength they had planned for. This marked the failure of the initial British move in Operation Crusader, an operation which would later succeed in forcing the Italian-German forces to retreat through a subsequent attrition battle.

Casualties and losses 
On the Italian side, 132nd Tank Regiment lost 34 tanks (29 M13/40s and five light tanks) and 132 men (5 officers and 11 men were killed, 5 officers and 45 men were wounded, and one officer and 65 men were missing), while the 8th Bersaglieri Regiment suffered 9 killed, 18 wounded and 17 missing and the 132nd Artillery Regiment had six wounded and lost one gun and three vehicles.

British tank losses are somewhat debated; 2nd Royal Gloucestershire Hussars lost 30 tanks and 50 men (11 killed, 19 wounded and 20 missing), 4th County of London Yeomanry lost eight tanks and 26 men (4 killed and 22 missing) and 3rd County of London Yeomanry reported the loss of four tanks, six men killed and an unspecified number of wounded. Nearly all of the British missing were taken prisoner. Some sources, however, claim that whereas British war diaries revealed accurate losses for 2nd Royal Gloucestershire Hussars and 4th County of London Yeomanry, the losses reportedly suffered by 3rd County of London Yeomanry were incomplete, as they were all related to one single squadron, while the war diaries contain no information about the other squadrons for several days. Correlli Barnett, in his book The Desert Generals, stated that British tank losses at Bir el Gubi amounted to 52 tanks. After Bir el Gubi the brigade reported that it had lost 82 tanks, and another account stated that it had only 10 to 20 battleworthy tanks left. These figures included not only battlefield losses but also Crusaders lost during the two days leading up to and including the battle due to mechanical problems.

Analysis 
The British attack was carried out with the Crusader tanks being used without infantry support and with only long-range artillery support. Ariete, instead, had learned the German tactics of tank-infantry coordination while training together with the Panzer units of the Afrika Korps during the previous months, and had put it into practice at Bir el Gubi.

See also 

 Operation Crusader
 132nd Armoured Division Ariete
 List of British military equipment of World War II
 List of Italian military equipment in World War II

Notes

References

Bibliography 
 Antonio Maraziti, "L'Ariete" a Bir el-Gobi, Storia Militare N° 136, January 2005.

External links 
 War Diary of 4th County of London Yeomanry, 1941
 War Diary of 3rd County of London Yeomanry, 1941
 War Diary of 2nd Royal Gloucestershire Hussars, 1941

Conflicts in 1941
1941 in Libya
Western Desert campaign
F
Battles of World War II involving Italy
November 1941 events